Salvesen Cove is a cove forming the south extremity of Hughes Bay, along the west coast of Graham Land. Its head is fed by Agalina, Krapets and Zimzelen Glaciers. Brabazon Point is the headland forming the east side of the entrance to Salveson Cove, Valdivia Point the northwest side.

The cove was partially outlined on the charts of the Belgian Antarctic Expedition under Gerlache, 1897–99. Probably named by whalers operating in this vicinity after Salvesen and Company, whalers of Leith, Scotland.

Coves of Graham Land
Danco Coast